Million Dolla Broke Niggaz: The DVS Mindz Exxxperience 1994-2000 was the first official full-length release from the Topeka, Kansas rap group DVS Mindz. “"We got million dollar dreams, but we ain't got no money,” Kutaculus, the group’s DJ, explained of the title. The CD has been long out of print, and physical copies are hard to find online, but the entire album is available for streaming.

1994-2000
Million Dolla Broke Niggaz was an anthology that contained tracks recorded during DVS Mindz' first six years. The CD contained some of the group's most popular songs as well as tracks that were rarely, if ever, performed live. The disc contained 15 tracks and was released on May 9, 2000. A limited-edition of 100 discs featuring different cover artwork, a slightly different track listing, and autographs by each member of DVS Mindz, was issued just prior to the official release.

Million Dolla Broke Niggaz compiled tracks from different eras of the group’s career, and the disc features seven producers (S.G., Tom Woosley, D.O.P.E., Dr. Who, Mr. Wolf, Boogieman and Rock). Several tracks are either solo ventures or feature special guests. Three tracks are listed as “Public Service Announcements,” featuring short raps from D.L., Killa The Hun, and Srtr8jakket. D.O.P.E. was unable to complete the recording of his public service announcement in time, and was therefore not included on the disc.

The phrase "million dolla broke niggas" first appeared in the song "Cradle Rock" by Method Man featuring Left Eye and Booster from the album Tical 2000: Judgement Day. D.O.P.E. also uses the phrase in the song "Niggaz (1137)" that appears on the DVS Mindz debut.

A changing sound

Four of the group’s most frequently performed live tracks were featured on the disc: “Madness,” “Tired of Talking,” (both produced by D.O.P.E.), "Bust Something," and "Niggaz (1137)" (both helmed by the production duo Boogieman and Rock). Two versions of “Tired of Talking” were recorded, the latter version of which was the more popular, at least with the group. DVS Mindz rarely performed the original version live, and the newer take was used as the soundtrack for the band's first music video. Puzzlingly, Million Dolla Broke Niggaz includes the original version of "Tired of Talking" rather than the newer one. It was rumored that the change was made due to failed negotiations to secure the production rights to the newer version of the song. “Bust Something,” a popular live cut, featured Kansas City rappers the Zou. The two newest tracks on the disc, “Bust Something” and “Niggaz (1137)” represented the group’s growing inclination towards hardcore, gangsta rap, a move embraced by newer fans, but one questioned by some longtime fans. “Our sound has changed,” Killa The Hun explained. “We've matured lyrically a lot. DVS Mindz has gone through some rebuilding, but now that we've got everything in order, we're like the stunt men of rap.... We come in and take the bumps and bruises and go on about the business."

Solo tracks and collaborations
In addition to the public service announcements, the group members contributed to the release in various ways. “Murdarous Verses” is a solo track featuring Killa the Hun, with D.L. contributing backup vocals. “Me Against Myself and I Prevail” features three of Str8jakkett’s personalities, all rapping in a schizophrenic bouillabaisse. D.O.P.E. produced two notable cuts, “Madness” and the original version of “Tired of Talking.”

The album also included lesser-known songs such as “DVS Mindbender,” which the group promoted as a potential single, performing the song several times in concert in the wake of the album's release. The album also featured rarely performed numbers such as “Unsigned Hype” and “Misrepresenters” two of the oldest tracks on the release.“Seven” is a seven-minute track with a chorus that doesn't show up until the last 30 seconds. The track features seven MCs, with DVS Mindz collaborating with a young trio called Qui-Lo, consisting of Jus an M.C. (who would later become Joe Good, an associate of Mac Lethal), Masta Chi (who would later become Titanium Frame), and Sket (who would later become Godemis and help found the Kansas City rap act Ces Cru). “These cats were like 17, 18 years old and they were on stage rocking 600 or 700 people at the Grenada,” Str8jakkett recalled in an interview. Qui-Lo was signed to DVS Mindz' independent label, No Coast Records, and recorded its debut album, which went unreleased after the trio disbanded.

CD release party
The release party for Million Dolla Broke Niggaz was held at the Granada Theater in Lawrence, Kansas on April 30, 2000. The show also featured the Zou, the 57th Street Rogue Dog Villains, and Tech N9ne. This performance remains the longest ever performance by DVS Mindz, clocking in at just over an hour. During the set, the band included songs that were rarely performed live, including “Murdarous Verses,” "Me Against Myself and I Prevail," and “Misrepresenters.”

Critical response
The disc received nearly universal praise from the local music press. The Pitch called it "sonic timeline of the Topeka rap outfit’s storied history." Music journalist JJ Hensley commended the "stellar DVS debut, which featured 'Tired of Talking' and 'Niggaz (1137),' two of the best hip-hop singles ever to come out of this area." Journalist Geoff Harkness opined in a June 1, 2000 review for the Lawrence Journal-World that "the DVS debut serves as a bell-ringing wake-up call to area rap groups: The game just got raised to a whole new level." Journalist Andrew Miller dubbed the album "essential." The Pitch named "Million Dolla Broke Niggaz" one of its best albums of 2000: "Eschewing Kansas City’s hardcore sound might have been easy for DVS Mindz to do, given that the crew hails from Topeka, but its collection of raw, tough-talking, and introspective songs on Million Dollar Broke Niggaz showed KC listeners that rap could be about more than simply getting fucked up." In 2014, blogger Mike Jones wrote that "Million Dolla Broke Niggaz" is "still a Top City classic."

Track listing errors
The disc's track listing shows Str8jakket as the MC on track #1, but it is D.L. rapping on the first track. D.L.'s public service announcement is listed as #10, but it is Str8jakkett rapping on the tenth track.

Track listing
"Public Service Announcement: D.L." – 0:40
"Madness" – 4:45
"DVS Mindbender” – 5.19
"Seven" (feat. Qui Lo) – 7:10
"Public Service Announcement: Killa The Hun” – 1:03
"Murdarous Verses” – 4:22
"Misrepresenters” – 6:13
"Tired of Talking" – 6:24
"Inferred Connection” (Feat. Bronz and Paw Paww) – 7:33
"Public Service Announcement: Str8jakkett” – 1:46
"Me Against Myself and I Prevail" – 5:38
"Unsigned Hype" – 5:09
"Bust Something (radio edit)" – 5:29
"Niggaz (1137)" – 6:00
"Yellow Brick Road" (Feat Pontiak) – 6:13

Personnel
Str8jakkett - vocals
Killa The Hun - vocals
D.O.P.E. - vocals
D.L. - vocals
Kutaculous - DJ
Godemis (Qui Lo)- vocals
Titanium Frame (Qui Lo)- vocals
Joe Good (Qui Lo)- vocals
Bronz - vocals
Paww Paww - vocals
Pontiak - vocals

References

External links
 "Niggaz (1137)" by DVS Mindz
 "Tired of Talking" by DVS Mindz
 Stream Million Dolla Broke Niggaz

2000 albums
Hip hop albums by American artists